Gérard Loiselle (April 15, 1921 - December 22, 1994) was a Canadian politician.  He was an eight-term Member of the House of Commons and was a City Councillor in Montreal, Quebec.

Federal politics
Born in Montreal, Quebec, Loiselle successfully ran as an Independent Liberal candidate in the district of Sainte-Anne in 1957 defeating the official Liberal nominee.  He was re-elected as a Liberal in 1958, 1962, 1963 and 1965.  He ran in the district of Saint-Henri in 1968 and won.  He was re-elected in 1972 and 1974.  He did not run for re-election in 1979.

He was Parliamentary Secretary to the Minister of Manpower and Immigration from 1968 to 1960 and to the Minister of Transport from 1969 to 1970.

City Councillor
He was elected to Montreal's City Council as an Independent candidate in 1950 in the district of Sainte-Anne.  He was re-elected in 1954, 1957, 1960, 1962 and 1966.  He did not run for re-election in 1970.

Electoral record (partial)

Footnotes

1921 births
1994 deaths
Independent Liberal MPs in Canada
Liberal Party of Canada MPs
Members of the House of Commons of Canada from Quebec
Montreal city councillors